RRA can refer to:

 Arrow-Pratt measure of relative risk-aversion
 Radioreceptor assay, a test to determine the binding affinity of a radioactive-labelled substance to its receptor
 Rahanweyn Resistance Army, also known as the Reewin Resistance Army, an armed faction in Somalia
 Russell Reynolds Associates, a global executive-search, and leadership and succession consulting firm. 
 Rainbow Routes Association, a non-profit organization in Canada dedicated to sustainable and active transportation 
 Rail America Inc., NYSE ticker code RRA
 Rapid Rural Appraisal, a term for Participatory rural appraisal
 Reiulf Ramstad Arkitekter, a Norwegian architecture and design studio in Oslo
 Revenue Reconciliation Act of 1993, US tax reform legislation
 Round Robin Archive, a database term used by the RRD Editor
 Red Ribbon Army, a fictional military organization that appears in the Dragon Ball metaseries
 Road Records Association, a British cycle racing organisation 
 Rock River Arms, an American firearms manufacturing company
 Internal Revenue Service Restructuring and Reform Act of 1998
 Rural Reconstruction Association, a British agricultural group
 Routing and Remote Access, a Microsoft API and server software
 Richardson Racing Automobiles, a defunct British racing car constructor
 Religious Research Association, an association of researchers and religious professionals

nl:RRA